The Célé is a  long river in the Cantal and Lot departments in south-western France, a tributary of the Lot. Its source is near Calvinet in the Cantal. It flows generally west through the following departments and towns:

 Cantal: Saint-Constant
 Lot: Bagnac-sur-Célé, Figeac

The Célé flows into the Lot at Bouziès.

References

Rivers of France
Rivers of Auvergne-Rhône-Alpes
Rivers of Occitania (administrative region)
Rivers of Cantal
Rivers of Lot (department)